Tim Wellens (born 10 May 1991) is a Belgian professional road cyclist, who currently rides for UCI WorldTeam . He is the son of former racing cyclist Leo Wellens and the nephew of cyclists Paul and Johan Wellens.

Career
Born in Sint-Truiden, Wellens has competed as a professional since the middle of the 2012 season, joining the  team after three seasons with the squad's development team.

2012 season
Wellens made his début with the team at the GP José Dubois, where he finished eighth; he later made his first appearances on the UCI World Tour, by competing in the Canadian pair of races in Quebec, and Montreal attempting to bridge to each race's breakaway during the respective events. Wellens performed strongly in the season-ending Tour of Beijing, finishing each of the race's stages inside the top 25 placings – taking a best of fifth on the final stage – en route to a final overall placing of tenth, and second to  rider Rafał Majka in the young rider classification.

2014 season

In August 2014, Wellens won Stage 6 in the Eneco Tour with a solo breakaway. The time he gained on this stage meant he ultimately won the race overall.

2015 season
He was named in the start list for the Tour de France. At the Eneco Tour, on Stage 6 Wellens attacked on the Côte Saint-Roch, then won nine seconds in the sprints in the golden kilometre. The main group was not able to chase Wellens down and his lead extended during the downhill run into Houffalize; he won the stage by 49 seconds ahead of Greg Van Avermaet, with Simon Geschke third. Wellens moved into the overall lead, 1' 03" ahead of Van Avermaet, with Wilco Kelderman dropping to third. Wellens defended his lead on the final stage to win his second successive Eneco Tour.

2016 season
At the Giro d'Italia, Wellens won Stage 6 after joining the successful breakaway partway through the stage. In July 2016, Wellens won Stage 5 of the Tour de Pologne with a solo breakaway in a rain soaked stage in which 85 riders abandoned. This gave him a lead of over 4 minutes in the general classification, which he successfully defended to the end of the race.

2017 season
Wellens abandoned Stage 15 of the Tour de France because of heat and pollen allergies which he refused to treat with a therapeutic use exemption (TUE), which he does not approve to use. Despite having asthma, Wellens does not use an inhaler and also criticised Chris Froome during his salbutamol case.

2018 season
Wellens' first victory in 2018 came at the Trofeo Serra de Tramuntana where he won the race for a second year in a row. At the Vuelta a Andalucía, Wellens won stage 4 and took the lead of the overall standings, by beating Mikel Landa on the cobbled climb of Alcalá de los Gazules.

2020 season
In October 2020, he was named in the startlist for the Vuelta a España. He won two stages during the race, and finished second to Guillaume Martin in the mountains classification.

2021 season
In February 2021, he won stage 3 of the Étoile de Bessèges and finished first in the general classification.

Major results

2008
 1st  National Junior XC MTB Championships
 4th Overall Liège–La Gleize
2009
 2nd Overall Tour d'Istrie
1st Stage 1
 3rd Overall Tre Giorni Orobica
 5th Road race, National Junior Road Championships
 5th Overall Liège–La Gleize
1st Stage 4
2010
 7th Overall Tour des Pays de Savoie
2011
 5th Time trial, National Under-23 Road Championships
 5th Overall Tour des Pays de Savoie
2012
 2nd Overall Toscana-Terra di Ciclismo
 2nd Overall Vuelta a Navarra
 4th Circuit de Wallonie
 8th Overall Circuit des Ardennes
1st  Young rider classification
 8th Grand Prix José Dubois
 10th Overall Tour de l'Avenir
 10th Overall Tour of Beijing
2013
 8th Overall Tour de Wallonie
2014
 1st  Overall Eneco Tour
1st Stage 6
 2nd Time trial, National Road Championships
 2nd Overall Ster ZLM Toer
 4th Giro di Lombardia
 6th GP Ouest–France
2015
 1st  Overall Eneco Tour
1st Stage 6
 1st Grand Prix Cycliste de Montréal
 2nd Trofeo Serra de Tramuntana
 10th Overall Paris–Nice
 10th Trofeo Andratx–Mirador d'es Colomer
2016
 1st  Overall Tour de Pologne
1st  Mountains classification
1st Stage 5
 Giro d'Italia
1st Stage 6
Held  after Stages 7–9
 1st Stage 7 Paris–Nice
 2nd Road race, National Road Championships
 10th Trofeo Serra de Tramuntana
 10th Amstel Gold Race
2017
 1st  Overall Tour of Guangxi
1st Stage 4
 1st Grand Prix de Wallonie
 1st Trofeo Serra de Tramuntana
 1st Trofeo Pollenca–Port de Andratx
 1st Stage 5 Vuelta a Andalucía
 2nd Overall BinckBank Tour
1st Stage 6
 3rd Strade Bianche
 4th Brabantse Pijl
 5th Grand Prix Cycliste de Québec
 9th Grote Prijs Jef Scherens
2018
 1st  Overall Tour de Wallonie
1st Stage 2
 1st  Overall Vuelta a Andalucía
1st Stage 4
 1st Brabantse Pijl
 1st Trofeo Serra de Tramuntana
 1st Stage 4 Giro d'Italia
 3rd Overall BinckBank Tour
 3rd Bretagne Classic
 5th Overall Paris–Nice
1st  Points classification
 5th Giro di Lombardia
 6th Amstel Gold Race
 7th La Flèche Wallonne
 7th Trofeo Lloseta–Andratx
2019
 1st Trofeo Serra de Tramuntana
 2nd Trofeo Andratx–Lloseta
 3rd Overall BinckBank Tour
1st Stage 4
 3rd Overall Tour of Belgium
1st Stage 3 (ITT)
 3rd Omloop Het Nieuwsblad
 3rd Brabantse Pijl
 4th Grand Prix Cycliste de Montréal
 5th Trofeo Campos, Porreres, Felanitx, Ses Salines
 8th Bretagne Classic
 9th Overall Vuelta a Andalucía
1st  Points classification
1st Stages 1 & 3 (ITT)
 9th Grand Prix Cycliste de Québec
 10th Strade Bianche
 10th Tre Valli Varesine
 Tour de France
Held  after Stages 3–17
 Combativity award Stages 3 & 6
2020
 Vuelta a España
1st Stages 5 & 14
Held  after Stages 5–6
 4th Overall Tour de Luxembourg
 5th Overall Volta ao Algarve
2021
 1st  Overall Étoile de Bessèges
1st Stage 3
 4th Overall Benelux Tour
 6th Overall Tour de Pologne
 6th Grand Prix La Marseillaise
 7th Overall Tirreno–Adriatico
2022
 1st Trofeo Serra de Tramuntana
 2nd Overall Tour des Alpes-Maritimes et du Var
1st Stage 2
 2nd Overall Tour of Belgium
 2nd Clásica Jaén Paraíso Interior
 4th Trofeo Calvià
 8th Strade Bianche
 8th Trofeo Pollença - Port d'Andratx
 9th Brabantse Pijl
 9th Japan Cup
2023
 1st Stage 3 Vuelta a Andalucía
 3rd Clásica Jaén Paraíso Interior
 5th Kuurne–Brussels–Kuurne
 6th Vuelta a Murcia

Grand Tour general classification results timeline

Classics results timeline

References

External links

Belgian male cyclists
1991 births
Living people
People from Sint-Truiden
Belgian Giro d'Italia stage winners
Belgian Vuelta a España stage winners
Cyclists from Limburg (Belgium)
Olympic cyclists of Belgium
Cyclists at the 2016 Summer Olympics
21st-century Belgian people